Tommaso d'Aquino may refer to:

Thomas Aquinas (1225–1274), Roman Catholic saint
Tommaso d'Aquino (bishop of Mottola) (1584-1651)
Tommaso d'Aquino (bishop of Sessa Aurunca) (1635–1705)
Tommaso d'Aquino (bishop of Vico Equense) (1657–1732)